The Custom Mary is a 2011 American drama film written and directed by Matt Dunnerstick. Set in Los Angeles, the film tells the story of young Latina in East Los Angeles, who meets an African-American Lowrider, and struggles to reconcile her faith and blossoming love affair while becoming dangerously involved in a religious attempt to clone Jesus.

Plot
Searching for purpose and meaning in the world, a young Latina in East Los Angeles becomes dangerously involved with a storefront church where a young minister enthralls her. At the same time, she meets Joe, a self-empowered African-American lowrider mechanic.

Mary, struggling to reconcile her faith and her blossoming love affair with Joe, is pulled into a group from the church who believes they can clone Jesus, with Mary's help. Mary becomes pregnant, and as the day of birth approaches, both Joe and the preachers fight for her attention. Battling real and imagined truths, Mary begins a secret journey to the desert, seeking answers in a surprising and surreal way.

The Custom Mary is a combination of a classic, indie love story and an exploration of faith and fanaticism, set amidst the gritty urban world of lowrider culture.

Notables
The film features one of the last performances of the late Bill McKinney.

Music by the Mexican indie band, Porter, appears throughout the film.

Exhibition and responses
The film was first shown at the 2011 New York International Latino Film Festival and also at the 2012 San Diego Black Film Festival, where it simultaneously won Best Cutting Edge film and Best Religious Topic Film, in addition to being nominated for Best Director, Best Feature, and Best Overall Film, It went on to play through the indie film circuit, particularly at Latino and Black film festivals, winning 8 awards and 4 nominations in the process. In 2013, it was distributed in the US by GoDigital.

Cast
 Alicia Sixtos — Mary
 James Jolly — Joe
 Travis Hammer — Paul Jr.
 Henry LeBlanc — Paul Sr.
 Spencer Scott — Jesus (voice)
 Dave Vescio — Pat
 Graciela Schrieber — Law of the Lowriders
 Hale — Choir Mary
 Bill McKinney - The Silent Boss
 Eileen Dietz — Mother

Cameos
 Richard Metzger, former television host of the TV series Disinformation & current host of the online blog, Dangerous Minds, appears as a TV Reporter.
 Janina Gavankar, of The L Word and True Blood notoriety, appears as Ms. Rime.

Review
 On TheEspresso.com: "The Custom Mary is a welcome expanding of vision and a modern parable worthy of your time."

References

External links
 

2010s Spanish-language films
2011 films
American drama films
2010s English-language films
2010s American films